Galatasaray SK. Men's 2011–2012 season is the 2011–2012 basketball season for Turkish professional basketball club Galatasaray Medical Park.

The club competes in:
2011–12 Euroleague
2011–12 Turkish Basketball League
2011–12 Turkish Cup Basketball
Turkish President's Cup

Roster

Depth chart

Squad changes for the 2011–2012 season

In:

Out:

Out On Loan:

Results, schedules and standings

Preseason games

Note: A youth team scrimmaged against Boluspor which represented first team.

Pınar Cup
Galatasaray MP won this tournament and Jamon Gordon was awarded Best Player.

Results

Euroleague 2011–12
The higher ranked team hosted the second leg.

Group D

Qualifying rounds

Regular season

Top 16 Group E

Matches

Turkish Basketball League 2011–12

Regular season

Turkish Cup 2011–12

Qualification round

Group D

Final eight

President's Cup 2011–12

References

2011
2011–12 in Turkish basketball by club
2011–12 Euroleague by club
Galatasaray Sports Club 2011–12 season